The following list is a discography of production and songwriting contributions by Mark Ralph, a British record producer currently based in London, England. It is split into the full list(s) of contributions and those that have performed in the charts across various countries.

International singles and certifications

Discography

Written songs

Produced songs

 indicates a co-production credit

 indicates an additional production credit

 indicates a vocal production credit

 signifies another name labelled as a co-producer

 signifies another name labelled as an additional producer

 signifies another name labelled as a vocal producer

References

Production discographies
Discographies of British artists